The Verstanclahorn is a mountain of the Swiss Silvretta Alps, located between Piz Buin and Piz Linard in the canton of Graubünden. The mountain has a pyramidal shape with the northern face lying above the Verstancla Glacier. The smaller glacier Vadret da las Maisas lies on the south side.

The mountain is located on the ridge between the central Graubünden (north) and the Engadine valley (south), also separating the basins of the Rhine and Inn River.

The closest locality is Lavin, on the southern side.

References

External links
 Verstanclahorn on Hikr

Mountains of the Alps
Alpine three-thousanders
Mountains of Switzerland
Mountains of Graubünden
Silvretta Alps
Klosters-Serneus
Zernez